Neev is a pronunciation of the Irish name Niamh.

Neev may also refer to:

Neev, Portuguese singer, (notable for "Breathe")
DJ Neev, UK-based Sikh radio DJ
Neycho Neev (born 1948), Bulgarian politician, vice-Prime Minister and minister
Neev, an Indian TV show aired in 1990s